Budíkov is a municipality and village in Pelhřimov District in the Vysočina Region of the Czech Republic. It has about 300 inhabitants.

Administrative parts
Villages of Malý Budíkov and Pusté Lhotsko are administrative parts of Budíkov.

History
The first written mention of Budíkov is from 1226.

References

Villages in Pelhřimov District